Suining railway station is a railway station located in Suining, Sichuan Province, People's Republic of China, on the Suiyu  Railway (Suining–Chongqing Railway) which is operated by China Railway Corporation.

References 

Railway stations in Sichuan